This is a list of airports in Manitoba. It includes all Nav Canada certified and registered water and land airports, aerodromes and heliports in the Canadian province of Manitoba.


List of airports and heliports
The list is sorted by the name of the community served; click the sort buttons in the table header to switch listing order.

Defunct airports

See also

 List of airports in the Winnipeg area

References 

 
Manitoba
Airports